Nitronium tetrafluoroborate is an inorganic compound with formula NO2BF4. It is a salt of nitronium cation and tetrafluoroborate anion. It is a colorless crystalline solid, which reacts with water to form the corrosive acids HF and HNO3. As such, it must be handled under water-free conditions. It is sparsely soluble in many organic solvents.

Preparation

Nitronium tetrafluoroborate can be prepared by adding a mixture of anhydrous hydrogen fluoride and boron trifluoride to a nitromethane solution of nitric acid or dinitrogen pentoxide.

Applications

Nitronium tetrafluoroborate is used as a nitration agent.

References

Tetrafluoroborates
Nitronium compounds